John R. Beasley (October 24, 1900 – November 2, 1978) was an American football player.  An Indiana native, he played college football at Earlham College and professional football as a guard for the Dayton Triangles in the National Football League (NFL). He appeared in five NFL games during the 1923 season.

References

1900 births
1978 deaths
Dayton Triangles players
Players of American football from Indiana
Earlham Quakers football players